Regal Gleam (March 17, 1964 – April 13, 1976) was an American Thoroughbred racehorse who was voted 1966 American Champion Two-Year-Old Filly honors.

Background
She was bred by Isidore Bieber and her trainer, U.S. Racing Hall of Fame inductee Hirsch Jacobs. She was owned by Jacobs' daughter, Patrice.

Racing career
In her Championship year, Regal Gleam won the Blue Hen Stakes at Delaware Park Racetrack, the Frizette Stakes at Aqueduct Racetrack, and the Selima Stakes at Laurel Park Racecourse.

At age three, Regal Gleam had an unsuccessful racing campaign, losing her first seven starts  and going the year without a stakes race win. Of her nineteen starts in 1967, she won only three minor races and was retired to broodmare duty.

Breeding record
Regal Gleam was purchased by Claiborne Farm of Paris, Kentucky, one of America's preeminent horse breeding operations. She was bred to stallions such as Buckpasser, Tom Rolfe and Round Table, the latter mating producing the very fast millionaire colt, Royal Glint.

Regal Gleam died at age twelve on April 13, 1976 at Claiborne Farm after complications from colic surgery.

Pedigree

References

1964 racehorse births
1976 racehorse deaths
Racehorses bred in Kentucky
Racehorses trained in the United States
American Champion racehorses
Thoroughbred family 1-x